B-Sides & Rarities Part II is a compilation by Nick Cave and the Bad Seeds, released on 22 October 2021. It is the sequel to the band's 2005 compilation B-Sides & Rarities and features 13 years of the band's B-sides and previously unreleased tracks spanning the years 2006-2019.

Content 
The collection features the original versions of the songs "Skeleton Tree" and "Girl in Amber" from the album Skeleton Tree as well as "Bright Horses" and "Waiting for You" from Ghosteen before they were re-written and re-recorded in their final album versions. Some of the tracks were credited to Nick Cave alone upon their original release, such as "Free to Walk" and "Avalanche".

Track listing 
All songs written by Nick Cave and Warren Ellis unless otherwise stated

Disc 1 
 "Hey Little Firing Squad" (Nick Cave) – 4:00
B-side of "Midnight Man", 2008
 "Fleeting Love" – 4:18
B-side of "More News From Nowhere", 2008
 "Accidents Will Happen" (Nick Cave) – 4:19
B-side of "Dig, Lazarus, Dig!!!", 2008
 "Free to Walk" (featuring Debbie Harry) (Jeffrey Lee Pierce) – 3:08
From the compilation "We Are Only Riders: The Jeffrey Lee Pierce Sessions Project", 2010
 "Avalanche" (Leonard Cohen) – 4:34
New version recorded for season two of the television series Black Sails, 2015
 "Vortex" (Nick Cave, Warren Ellis, Martyn P. Casey, Jim Sclavunos) – 4:38
Previously unreleased studio outtake, 2006
 "Needle Boy" – 3:54
From the single "Needle Boy", 2013
 "Lightning Bolts" (Nick Cave, Warren Ellis, Thomas Wydler) – 3:49
From the single "Needle Boy", 2013
 "Animal X" (Nick Cave, Warren Ellis, Thomas Wydler) – 3:51
From the single "Animal X", 2013
 "Give Us a Kiss" – 3:34
From the single "Give Us a Kiss", 2014
 "Push the Sky Away" (live with the Melbourne Symphony Orchestra) – 5:20
Previously unreleased live recording

Disc 2
 "First Skeleton Tree" (Nick Cave) – 3:05
Previously unreleased studio outtake, 2013/2014
 "King Sized Nick Cave Blues" (Nick Cave) – 3:53
Previously unreleased studio outtake, 2013/2014
 "Opium Eyes" – 2:27
Previously unreleased studio outtake, 2013/2014
 "Big Dream (With Sky)" – 3:27
Previously unreleased studio outtake, 2018/2019
 "Instrumental #33" – 2:26
Previously unreleased studio outtake, 2013/2014
 "Hell Villanelle" – 3:49
Previously unreleased studio outtake, 2013/2014
 "Euthanasia" (Nick Cave) – 2:47
Previously unreleased studio outtake, 2013/2014
 "Life Per Se" – 2:59
Previously unreleased studio outtake, 2013/2014
 "Steve McQueen" – 3:49
Previously unreleased studio outtake, 2013/2014
 "First Bright Horses" – 2:35
Previously unreleased studio outtake, 2018/2019
 "First Girl in Amber" – 2:59
Previously unreleased studio outtake, 2013/2014
 "Glacier" – 2:39
Previously unreleased studio outtake, 2011/2012
 "Heart That Kills You" – 3:05
Previously unreleased studio outtake, 2018/2019
 "First Waiting for You" – 1:41
Previously unreleased studio outtake, 2018/2019
 "Sudden Song" – 1:41
Previously unreleased studio outtake, 2013/2014
 "Earthlings" – 3:00
Previously unreleased studio outtake, 2018/2019

Charts

References 

B-side compilation albums
Nick Cave compilation albums
2021 compilation albums
Mute Records compilation albums
Sequel albums